The Subaru six-cylinder engines are a series of flat-6 engines manufactured by Subaru, a division of Fuji Heavy Industries, made in three distinct generations. The ER27, derived from the Subaru EA first-generation flat-4, was used as the sole engine option in the premium model 1988–91 Subaru Alcyone VX (XT6 in the United States). The EG33, derived from the Subaru EJ second-generation flat-4, was used exclusively in the successor Subaru Alcyone SVX, again as its sole engine option, sold from 1991–96. The EZ series, consisting of the EZ30 and EZ36 models, was designed to be almost as compact as the EJ25 flat-4. The EZ30/36 were the first Subaru six-cylinder engines available outside the sport coupes, used as the uplevel option for Subaru Legacy (2002–19) and Outback/Lancaster (2001–19) as well as the sole option in the Subaru Tribeca (2006–14).

ER27

Created as a refined luxury engine with improved power over the EA82T, Subaru introduced the ER27 engine in November 1985 for the Subaru ACX-II concept car, shown at the Tokyo Motor Show and billed as the 'concept car of the near future.' The concept went into production as the Subaru Alcyone VX (Subaru XT6 in North America) in August 1987, the exclusive application for the ER27.

When the ER27 was introduced, it was the only water-cooled flat-6 automobile engine on the market. The ER27 designation was the first time Subaru incorporated the engine's displacement into the engine designation and all subsequent engine codes have retained this nomenclature.

Design
Like the EA series engines, the ER27 engine featured 2-valve cylinder heads with hydraulic lash adjusters and the ER27 and EA engines shared the same bore, stroke, and spacing. While recognised as bearing many similarities to the Subaru EA82 engine, there are numerous differences in design between the two engines and a large portion of parts are unique to the ER27. For instance, the oil and water pumps are unique to the ER27, sharing similar bolt patterns and design to the EA82, but being of a higher flow in both cases.

The intake manifold uses a two piece design with a lower section bolting to the heads containing the coolant bridge, injectors and various vacuum lines. The upper intake manifold then bolts to the lower section and is unlike the EA82 or EJ22 "spider" manifold designs in that there is no central plenum chamber.

The valve timing system is belt-drive using two individual timing belts, curiously one belt uses a spring tensioner (like the EA82) whilst the other uses a hydraulic tensioner (like the EJ22).

Both JDM and USDM versions of the ER27 used multi-point electronic fuel injection.

EG33

Similar to how the six-cylinder ER27 is related to the earlier four-cylinder EA82, the EG33 shared bore and stroke dimensions with the contemporary four-cylinder EJ22. The EG33 was exclusively fitted to the Alcyone SVX, where it was paired with the 4EAT automatic transmission in both front- and all-wheel-drive configurations.

After the SVX was discontinued, Subaru did not offer a six-cylinder engine until the EZ30 was developed and released for the Subaru Outback.

Design
Unlike the SOHC EJ22 it shared some dimensions with, the EG33 featured dual overhead cams; both engines used four valves per cylinder. The EG33 used a single toothed timing belt which drove the exhaust camshafts on each bank in addition to the water pump (mounted on the right bank); the intake camshaft on each cylinder bank was driven in turn by a set of helical gears via the belt-driven exhaust camshaft.

At the time, the EG33 was the largest naturally-aspirated engine that Subaru had ever made for regular production; in the 1990s, Subaru branded the Subaru 1235, a 3.5 L flat-12 engine designed by Carlo Chiti and Motori Moderni, intended for Formula 1 racing, although Christian von Koenigsegg reportedly was later interested in the engine for his supercar.

EZ30 and EZ36

In the United States, the EZ30 was introduced in the Outback H6-3.0 in November 2000 for the 2001 model year. In Japan, the EZ30 was introduced in the equivalent Lancaster 6 wagon in May 2000. A twin-turbo version of the EZ30 was produced for the Subaru B11S concept car, unveiled at Geneva in 2003.  The EZ30 was refreshed in 2003, and when the Tribeca was introduced for the 2006 model year in January 2005, the EZ30 II was the sole engine option.

The EZ36 was introduced with the restyled Tribeca for the 2008 model year, and replaced the 3.0 L EZ30 in the Legacy and Outback starting in 2009 for the 2010 model year.

Starting with the 2020 model year, the six-cylinder EZ36 was dropped as the uplevel engine option for Subaru Legacy and Outback automobiles and instead the premium engine offered was the turbocharged four-cylinder FA24F, which was previously introduced for the 2019 model year as the sole engine option for the Subaru Ascent, the successor to the Tribeca.

Notes

Design

EZ30D mk I
The design of the EZ30 is credited to Noriaki Sekine. Unlike prior Subaru flat-6 designs, the EZ30 has a significantly smaller bore pitch (the distance between adjacent cylinder centerlines on each bank of the engine block) than the contemporary flat-4 EJ-series. The EZ30 also used a timing chain to drive the camshaft, while the earlier flat-4 EJ series uses a timing belt instead.

A butterfly valve in the intake manifold opened at higher engine speeds, shortening the intake length and providing a passive supercharging effect through resonance. The exhaust was also equipped with a valve which opened at high backpressure, increasing the effective muffler volume.

EZ30D mk II 

For the 2004 model year, the EZ30 was revised to add the Subaru active valve lift system to the intake cam, a system similar to Porsche's VarioCam, providing both variable valve timing and lift for the intake valves, which resulted in increased power, torque, and economy. The cylinder heads for the EZ30D mk II were also revised to include three exhaust ports per head instead of the single exhaust port used in the original EZ30D mk I, which gathered the exhaust from each cylinder bank into a single port.

EZ36
Compared to the EZ30, the EZ36 has larger bore and stroke; the EZ36 uses slightly thinner iron cylinder sleeves to increase bore, and uses asymmetric connecting rods to allow for an increase in stroke. A revised cooling system and variable valve timing (AVCS was now fitted to both intake and exhaust valves) allowed the EZ36 to run on regular unleaded fuel, instead of the premium unleaded required by the EZ30.

References

External links

Subaru engines
Boxer engines
Flat-six engines